Idalus flavicostalis is a moth of the family Erebidae first described by Walter Rothschild in 1935. It is found in the Brazilian state of Santa Catarina.

References

flavicostalis
Moths described in 1935